Joon S.A.S. was a French airline based at Charles de Gaulle Airport, north of Paris. Founded in 2017 as a subsidiary of Air France, the airline ceased operations on 27 June 2019, and was merged back into Air France.

History
Joon was aimed at young people, according to its parent company Air France, with the word "Joon" sounding similar to the French word jeune, meaning young. It intended to serve destinations with heavy competition from low-cost carriers, reducing costs via lower-paid cabin crew. Joon commenced operations on 1 December 2017, serving short and medium-haul destinations within Europe, with initial routes to Barcelona, Berlin, Lisbon and Porto. Long-haul destinations in the Americas and Africa were added in Summer 2018.

In April 2018, it was announced that Joon had plans to operate 28 aircraft by 2020, consisting of 18 short to medium haul and 10 long haul aircraft. However, it was not specified whether the aircraft would be transferred from Air France or ordered solely for Joon. Some of the long haul aircraft Joon planned to operate were Airbus A350-900s.

On 29 November 2018, French newspaper Le Figaro reported that Air France–KLM's newly appointed CEO, Benjamin Smith, was considering dissolving Joon and reintegrating its operations into those of Air France, however no decision had been made by the board at the time. On 10 January 2019, Air France confirmed that it would reabsorb Joon's aircraft and staff by 26 June 2019.

Destinations
Joon had operated to the following destinations as of 27 June 2019, with some destinations already discontinued by that date:

Fleet

As of 27 June 2019, at the time of the airline's reintegration, Joon operated the following aircraft:

See also
 List of defunct airlines of France
 Transport in France

References

External links

Defunct airlines of France
Airlines established in 2017
Airlines disestablished in 2019
Air France–KLM
French brands
Companies based in Paris
Former SkyTeam affiliate members
French companies established in 2017
French companies disestablished in 2019